Pythaids were ritual processions of the Athenians to Delphi, in remembrance of the initial journey of Apollo from Delos to Delphi through Athens.

Description
The Pythaids were "theories", i.e. processions of the Athenians to Delphi. They took place in non canonical periods, usually following specific omens. The Pythaids that we know best of were four particularly majestic processions which took place between 138/7 – 98/7 B.C. They constituted a clear effort of the Athenians to link their ancestral myths to the Apollonian mythology.

The starting point of the Pythaids remains unknown; however the literary sources mention that they were already taking place in the 4th century B.C. It seems that they were interrupted in the 3rd century B.C., but they started again in the 2nd century B.C., in a period when Athens regained its prestige with the generous benefactions of the Hellenistic kings of Asia Minor.

Our main sources for the Pythaids remain the lengthy inscriptions which were carved on the external walls of the Athenian Treasury, recording the names of the participants and other useful detail. As far as literary sources are concerned, the main testimony belongs to Strabo, who mentions Aelius Aristides and Ephoros, as well as the lexicographers. 
Furthermore, a careful reading of the Delphic Hymns to Apollo illuminates the mythological connections that the Athenians tried to establish. Thus, Apollo is born under an olive tree, the sacred tree of the goddess Athena, a fact which reflects the Athenian supremacy over the Delian League and its treasury. 
Furthermore, the tragedy "Ion" by Euripides aims at justifying the worship of Apollo "patroos" in Athens: Kreousa, mother of Ion, falls victim of rape by Apollo. She abandons the newborn in a remote region, from where Hermes, under order of Apollo, transfers him to Delphi, to be brought up by Pythia. 
The land route between Athens and Delphi is said to have been opened for the purpose of facilitating the Athenians to visit the sanctuary of Apollo. It was said that this road was full of bandits, that Theseus managed to disperse.

The particularly majestic procession of 138/7 B.C. is a token of the  ambition of the Athenians to demonstrate their renewed control over Delos through the clerouchies. The participation of officials and plain citizens in so large numbers aimed at manifesting a unified and unbreachable citizen body, consisting of free citizens.

The rituals
The exact rituals which took place are more or less unknown to us. It seems, however, that upon the arrival of the procession to Delphi the participants offered presents to the god, among which a tripod. Then a ritual cleansing took place, which was accomplished with the use of fire, which the Athenians took them back to their city by means of a torch. An effort was made to identify the rituals with historic and mythological events, such as the killing of Python, paralleled to the defeat of the Gauls in the 3rd century B.C.

References

Bibliography
Tracy, N., "Notes on the Pythais inscriptions", BCH 99, 1975, 215–218
Bélis, A., Les Hymnes à Apollon, CID III, 1992
Karila-Cohen, K., 2005,"Apollon, Athènes et la Pythaide: mise en scène mythique de la cite au IIe s. av. J.-C.", Kernos 18, 219–239

Rituals